The Maxakalían languages (also Mashakalían) were first classified into the Jê languages. It was only in 1931 that Čestmír Loukotka separated them from the Jê family. Alfred Métraux and Curt Nimuendajú considered the Maxakalían family isolated from others. John Alden Mason suggests a connection with the Macro-Jê stock, confirmed by Aryon Rodrigues.

Languages
Apart from extinct varieties generally seen as dialects of Maxakalí, Mason noted resemblances with a few other extinct languages of the area: Pataxó, Malalí and Coropó. However, Coropó is now thought to be a Purian language. Campbell (1997) therefore lists the Maxakalian languages as:

 Malalí (†)
 Pataxó (Patashó) (†) (retain some words)
 Maxakalí (Mashacalí) (1,270 speakers)

Glottolog (2016) restores Coropó (Koropó) as a Maxakalían language.

Nikulin (2020)
Nikulin (2020) proposes the following internal classification of the Maxakalían languages:

Maxakalí
Malalí
Nuclear Maxakalí
Maxakalí
Ritual Maxakalí; Makoní
Pataxó; Pataxó-Hãhãhãe
Koropó

Maxakalí is a sister of Krenák and possibly also Kamakã. Together, they form a Trans-São Francisco branch within the Macro-Jê language phylum in Nikulin's (2020) classification.

Ramirez (2015)
Internal classification of the Maxakali languages according to Ramirez, et al. (2015):

Malali
Maxakali-Pataxó
(?) Koropó
Maxakali proper
Maxakali
Old Machacari (including: Monoxó, Makoni, Kapoxó, Kumanaxó, Panhame, etc.)
Pataxó of Wied
Pataxó-Hãhãhãe

Currently, Maxakali (excluding Old Machacari) is the only living language, while all other languages are extinct.

Pataxó as documented by Prince Maximilian of Wied-Neuwied (1989: 510-511) in 1816 is distinct from Pataxó-Hãhãhãe. Pataxó-Hãhãhãe was spoken into the 20th century and has been documented by Meader (1978: 45-50), Loukotka (1963: 32-33), and Silva & Rodrigues (1982).

Many Maxakalian varieties are attested only from 19th-century word lists, some of which are:
Mashacari (A.St-Hil, 2000: 274; Wied, 1989: 509-510) [collected in 1816-1817]
Kapoxó (Martius, 1863: 170-172) [collected in 1818]
Monoxó (Saint-Hilaire, 2000: 181) [collected in 1817]
Makoni (Saint-Hilaire, 2000: 212; Martius, 1863: 173-176; Wied, 1989: 512-513) [collected in 1816-1818]
Malali (Saint-Hilaire, 2000: 181; Martius, 1863: 207-208; Wied, 1989: 511-512) [collected in 1816-1818]

Loukotka (1968)
Below is a full list of Mashakali languages and dialects listed by Loukotka (1968), including names of unattested varieties.

Western
Mashakali / Maxacari - language once spoken in the state of Minas Gerais on the Marucí River and Jucurucu River, later on the Belmonte River.
Kaposho / Capoxo - once spoken on the Araçuaí River.
Kumanasho / Cumanaxo - extinct language originally spoken on the Suaçuí Grande River, state of Minas Gerais, later at the sources of the Gravatá River, state of Bahia.
Moakañi - once spoken on the Fanado River (Panado River) near Conceição, later on the Caravelas River. (Unattested)
Pañáme - once spoken on the Suaçuí Pequeno River, Minas Gerais.
Monoxo / Monachobm / Menacho - originally spoken on the Itanhaém River and now on the Posto Paraguaçu, state of Bahia.
Makoni - formerly spoken on the Caravelas River and near Alto dos Bois.
Paraxirn - once spoken on the Suaçuí Pequeno River. (Unattested)
Bonitó - once spoken on the Suaçuí Grande River near Peçanha and Bonito. (Unattested)
Goaña - once spoken on the Corrente River and Guanhães River. (Unattested)
Malacaxi - extinct language between Malacacheta and Urupuca (near Água Boa, Minas Gerais). (Unattested)
Mapoxo - formerly spoken on the Suaçuí Grande River. (Unattested)
Xonin - once spoken between the Peçanha River, Figueira River, and Doce River. (Unattested)
Moxotó - extinct language once spoken on the Suaçuí Grande River and Suaçuí Pequeno River near Peçanha. (Unattested)
Toréjicana - once spoken between the Araçuaí River and Fanado River. (Unattested)
Vocoin - once spoken between the Araçuaí River and Jequitinhonha River. (Unattested)
Batum - once spoken between the Doce River and Conceição River. (Unattested)

Eastern
Patasho - originally spoken between the Jequitinhonha River and São Francisco River in the state of Minas Gerais; the last survivors became extinct on the right shore of the Jequitinhonha River, Espirito Santo.
Tocoyó - extinct language originally spoken in the valley of the Araçuaí River and near Minas Novas de Fanado in the state of Minas Gerais, later on the right bank of the Jequitinhonha River in the state of Espirito Santo. (Unattested)
Maquinuca - once spoken near the Salto Grande on the Jequitinhonha River. (Unattested)
Canarin - once spoken on the Caravelas River and Mucuri River, state of Espirito Santo. (Unattested)
Tucanuçú - once spoken south of the Jequitinhonha River near Campos de Caatinga. (Unattested)
Aboninim - once spoken in the state of Minas Gerais in the Serra Geral do Espinhaço. (Unattested)
Catiguasú - once spoken in the state of Minas Gerais between the Jequitinhonha River and São Francisco River. (Unattested)
Hahaháy - spoken in the state of Bahia on the Cachoeira River.

Southern
Malali - extinct language formerly spoken in the Serra Redonda and on the Suaçuí Pequeno River, Minas Gerais.
Zamplan - once spoken on the Doce River and at the sources of the Piracicaba River. (Unattested)

Mason (1950)
Mason (1950) lists:

Mashacalí
Caposhó (Koposǒ)
Cumanashó (Kumanaxó)
Macuní (Makoni)
Mashacalí (Maxakarí)
Monoshó (Monoxó)
Panyame (Paname)

Vocabulary
Loukotka (1968) lists the following basic vocabulary items for the Mashakali languages.

References

Bibliography

 Campbell, Lyle. (1997). American Indian languages: The Historical Linguistics of Native America. New York: Oxford University Press. .
 Kaufman, Terrence. (1990). Language history in South America: What We Know and How to Know More. In D. L. Payne (Ed.), Amazonian Linguistics: Studies in Lowland South American Languages (pp. 13–67). Austin: University of Texas Press. .
 Kaufman, Terrence. (1994). The Native Languages of South America. In C. Mosley & R. E. Asher (Eds.), Atlas of the World's Languages (pp. 46–76). London: Routledge.

 
Nuclear Macro-Jê languages
Indigenous languages of South America (Central)
Indigenous languages of Eastern Brazil